The Argyll & Bute Militia was a part-time military unit in the west of Scotland from 1798 to 1909, serving in Home Defence during the French Revolutionary War, Napoleonic Wars and Second Boer War. Originally an infantry regiment, it was converted into artillery in 1861.

Precursors
The old county militia in Scotland was not re-established at the Restoration of 1660. After the Union in 1707, during the War of the Spanish Succession, the Parliament of Great Britain passed an Act in 1708 to re-arm the Scottish Militia. However, the Act was denied Royal assent because of fears that the new force would be disloyal (a Jacobite uprising in Scotland was expected to support the French invasion fleet that was then at sea). During the serious Jacobite rising of 1745, the government-supporting Major-General John Campbell of Mamore (later 4th Duke of Argyll) raised the irregular Campbell of Argyll Militia, which was present at the Battle of Falkirk Muir, the Skirmish of Keith, and the Battle of Culloden.

The Militia Act of 1757 passed during the Seven Years' War still did not apply to Scotland, but the Duke of Argyll was commissioned to raise the Argyle Fencibles (1759) for home defence. 'Fencibles' were soldiers recruited in the normal way under officers commissioned by the king, unlike militiamen who were raised by ballot and commanded by local officers appointed by the Lord-lieutenant. The Argyle Fencibles were disbanded in 1763, but fresh regiments were raised during the American War of Independence (the Argyle or Western Fencibles (1778)) and the French Revolutionary War (the Argyle Fencibles (1793), eventually of three battalions).

Argyll & Bute Militia
Fear of Jacobitism had been replaced by fear of Jacobinism by the 1790s, and the Militia Act of 1797 finally extended the county militia system to Scotland. The Argyllshire Militia was raised in 1798 with personnel from the disbanded 117th Regiment of Foot (originally raised on 22 August 1794 under the command of the Hon Frederick St John). The regiment was renamed the Argyll and Bute Militia in 1802, and the following year received the precedence of 43rd in the list of militia regiments.

The militia were disembodied at the end of the Napoleonic Wars, but the regiments remained in existence, theoretically being called out for occasional drills. The list of precedence was redrawn in 1833, when the Argyll & Bute Militia became 117th. In the 1840s its headquarters was listed as Campbeltown, and its Colonel since 1809 had been John Campbell, 7th Duke of Argyll; he was succeeded by John Campbell, 2nd Marquess of Breadalbane, the Lord Lieutenant of Argyllshire.

The United Kingdom Militia was revived by the Militia Act of 1852, enacted during a period of international tension. As before, units were raised and administered on a county basis, and filled by voluntary enlistment (although conscription by means of the Militia Ballot might be used if the counties failed to meet their quotas). Training was for 56 days on enlistment, then for 21–28 days per year, during which the men received full army pay. Under the Act, Militia units could be embodied by Royal Proclamation for full-time home defence service in three circumstances:
 1. 'Whenever a state of war exists between Her Majesty and any foreign power'.
 2. 'In all cases of invasion or upon imminent danger thereof'.
 3. 'In all cases of rebellion or insurrection'.

Although many militia regiments were embodied during the Crimean War to release regular battalions for overseas service, the Argyll & Bute was not among them. However, in 1859 it gained the title of Argyll & Bute Rifles. Its uniform was red with black velvet facings. More officers began to be appointed to the regiment, including Colonel John Campbell, formerly of the 38th Foot, who was appointed Lieutenant-Colonel Commandant under the Marquess of Breadalbane's colonelcy.

Argyll & Bute Artillery Militia

The 1852 Act introduced Militia Artillery units in addition to the traditional infantry regiments. Their role was to man coastal defences and fortifications, relieving the Royal Artillery (RA) for active service. In 1861 the Argyll and Bute Rifles was converted into the Argyll and Bute Artillery Militia (Rifles) (though the 'Rifles' subtitle was soon dropped). It had its HQ at Oban, moving back to Campbeltown in 1863. Smollett M. Eddington, a former Lieutenant in the 78th Highlanders, was appointed Lt-Col Commandant on 20 November 1861.

Following the Cardwell Reforms a mobilisation scheme began to appear in the Army List from December 1875. This assigned places in an order of battle of the 'Garrison Army' to Militia Artillery units: the Argyll & Bute Artillery's war station was in the Tilbury Division of the Thames and Medway Defences. The Artillery Militia was reorganised into 11 divisions of garrison artillery in 1882, and the Argyll & Bute became the 6th Brigade, Scottish Division, RA. When the Scottish Division was abolished in 1889 the title was altered to Argyll and Bute Artillery (Southern Division) RA. Colonel J. Younger, who had served with the Royal Horse Artillery in the 2nd Anglo-Afghan War, was appointed Lt-Col Commandant on 2 December 1893.

West of Scotland Artillery
By 1895 it had become difficult to obtain recruits in the sparsely populated counties of Argyll and Bute, so the recruiting area was expanded to include Lanarkshire and Renfrewshire, and on 7 November 1895 royal approval was given for the unit's title to be changed to The West of Scotland Artillery. Its HQ moved from Campbeltown to Maryhill Barracks, Glasgow, in 1897. The unit was embodied for home defence from 8 May to 3 October 1900 during the Second Boer War. Francis A. Walker-Jones was appointed Lt-Col on 28 November 1900.

From 1902 most units of the Militia artillery formally became part of the Royal Garrison Artillery, the unit taking the title of West of Scotland RGA (M).

Disbandment
After the Boer War, the future of the Militia was called into question. There were moves to reform all the Auxiliary Forces (Militia, Yeomanry and Volunteers) to take their place in the six Army corps proposed by St John Brodrick as Secretary of State for War. For this, some batteries of Militia Artillery were to be converted to field artillery. However, little of Brodrick's scheme was carried out.

Under the more sweeping Haldane Reforms of 1908, the Militia was replaced by the Special Reserve, a semi-professional force whose role was to provide reinforcement drafts for Regular units serving overseas in wartime. Although the West of Scotland RGA (M) transferred to the Special Reserve Royal Field Artillery on 12 July 1908 (taking the title West of Scotland Royal Field Reserve Artillery), it was disbanded in March 1909.

Honorary Colonels
The following served as Colonel or Honorary Colonel of the unit:
 John Campbell, 7th Duke of Argyll, appointed 1809
 John Campbell, 2nd Marquess of Breadalbane, Lord-Lieutenant of Argyll
 Col Smollett M. Eddington, former Lt-Col Commandant, appointed Hon Col 22 October 1884
 Col John Younger, former Lt-Col Commandant, appointed Hon Col 3 June 1905

Notes

References
 Col John K. Dunlop, The Development of the British Army 1899–1914, London: Methuen, 1938.
 J.B.M. Frederick, Lineage Book of British Land Forces 1660–1978, Vol II, Wakefield: Microform Academic, 1984, .
 Lt-Col James Moncrieff Grierson (Col Peter S. Walton, ed.), Scarlet into Khaki: The British Army on the Eve of the Boer War, London: Sampson Low, 1899/London: Greenhill, 1988, .
 H.G. Hart, The New Annual Army List (various dates from 1840).
 Richard Holmes, Soldiers: Army Lives and Loyalties from Redcoats to Dusty Warriors, London: HarperPress, 2011, .
 Norman E.H. Litchfield, The Militia Artillery 1852–1909 (Their Lineage, Uniforms and Badges), Nottingham: Sherwood Press, 1987, .
 Edward M. Spiers, The Army and Society 1815–1914, London: Longmans, 1980, .
 Edward M. Spiers, The Late Victorian Army 1868–1902, Manchester: Manchester University Press, 1992/Sandpiper Books, 1999, .
 Katherine Thomasson & Francis Buist, Battles of the '45, London: Batsford 1962/Pan 1967.

External sources
 Land Forces of Britain, the Empire and Commonwealth – Regiments.org (archive site)

Military units and formations in Argyll and Bute
Military units and formations established in 1798
Argyll